Patrick Oliver Femerling (born 4 March 1975) is a German former professional basketball player who played as a center.

Professional career
Femerling was born in Hamburg. He played for ALBA Berlin in Germany and with them he won three German League championships (1999, 2000, 2008). From 2000 to 2002, he played for Olympiacos and with them he won the Greek Cup (2002). In 2003, Femerling won the EuroLeague championship while playing for FC Barcelona. He also won two Spanish League championships (2003, 2004), one Spanish King's Cup (2003), and one Spanish Supercup with FC Barcelona. He also played for Panathinaikos and with them he won two Greek League championships and two Greek Cups (2005, 2006).

German national team
Femerling won the bronze medal at the 2002 FIBA World Championship and the silver medal at the 2005 FIBA European Championship while playing with the German national team.

External links
Euroleague.net Profile
Career Insports.gr

1975 births
Living people
2002 FIBA World Championship players
2006 FIBA World Championship players
Alba Berlin players
Basketball players at the 2008 Summer Olympics
Centers (basketball)
FC Barcelona Bàsquet players
German expatriate basketball people in Spain
German expatriate basketball people in the United States
German expatriate sportspeople in Greece
German men's basketball players
Kepez Belediyesi S.K. players
Liga ACB players
Olympiacos B.C. players
Olympic basketball players of Germany
Panathinaikos B.C. players
Real Betis Baloncesto players
Sportspeople from Hamburg
Washington Huskies men's basketball players